James LaRue (May 12, 1934 – December 30, 2012) was an American sound engineer. He was nominated for an Academy Award in the category Best Sound for the film Tron.

Selected filmography
 Project U.F.O. (TV series) (1978-1979)
 Tron (1982)
 A Nightmare on Elm Street (1984)
 Moving Violations (1985)
 The Flash (TV series) (1990-1991)
 MacGyver (TV series) (1991-1992)
 Space Jam (1996)
 Charmed (TV series) (1998-1999)
 The X-Files (TV series) (2001-2002)

References

External links

1934 births
2012 deaths
American audio engineers